Varvara Nikolaevna Annenkova (1795 in Nizhny Novgorod – 1866) was a prominent Russian poet and member of the nobility of Nizhny Novgorod.  Her work was influenced by close friend and mentor, poet Mikhail Lermontov.

Selected works
For the Chosen Few 1844
Poems 1854-56
"Wonder-Yonder" 1866
"Charlotte Corday" 1866

Family
Born into the wealthy Annenkov family, daughter of Colonel Nicholas Nikanorovich Annenkov (1764–1839), she was the sister of General Nicholas Annenkov and the poet Ivan Annenkov (1796–1829) and also a cousin of Ivan Annenkov, who was exiled to Siberia for his role in the Decembrist Uprising of 1825.

Footnotes

1795 births
1866 deaths
Russian nobility
Poets from the Russian Empire
Varvara
Russian women poets
Women writers from the Russian Empire
19th-century women writers from the Russian Empire
19th-century writers from the Russian Empire
19th-century poets from the Russian Empire